Ballintober could refer to two Irish towns:

 Ballintober, County Roscommon
 An alternate spelling for Ballintubber, County Mayo